Jai Hind is a salutation and slogan that originally meant "Victory to Hindustan", and in contemporary colloquial usage often means "Long live India" or "Salute to India". Coined by Champakaraman Pillai and used during India's independence movement from British rule, it emerged as a battle cry and in political speeches.

Etymology and nomenclature
The word "jai" is derived from jaya (Sanskrit), which means "triumph, victory, cheers, bravo, rejoice". The word jaya appears in Vedic literature such as in Atharvaveda 8.50.8 and in post-Vedic literature such as the Mahabharata.

History
In 1907, Champakaraman Pillai coined the term "Jai Hind", which was adopted as slogan of the Indian National Army in the 1940s at the suggestion of Abid Hasan. After India's independence, it emerged as a national slogan.

According to Sumantra Bose the phrase is devoid of any religious tones. The term became popular as a slogan and greeting of the Indian National Army organized by Bose and his colleagues, particularly between 1943–45. 
After India's independence, it emerged as a national slogan, and has been a common form of greeting the Indian people by political leaders and prime ministers such as Jawaharlal Nehru, Indira Gandhi, Rajiv Gandhi, P.V. Narasimha Rao, and others. Indira Gandhi in particular often ended her political speeches with a triple shout of "Jai Hind". Since the mid-1990s, it came to be used as a greeting among Indian Army personnel.

In popular culture
A follower of Subhas Chandra Bose, Ramchandra Moreshwar Karkare, of Gwalher (Gwalior) Madhya Bharat, wrote the patriotic drama Jai Hind in March 1947, and published a book in Hindi with the same title. Later, Karkare became Congress president of Central India Province.

The Jai Hind postmark was the first commemorative postmark of Independent India. The first stamps of an independent India were issued on November 21, 1947 with Jai Hind inscribed on them, in 1.5 anna, 3.5 anna and 12 anna denominations. Along with Jai Hind, these bore images of the Lion Capital of Ashoka, the national flag, and an aircraft respectively. "जय हिन्द" is also stated on the first, Independence series of Indian stamps.

The phrase is used on All India Radio at the end of a broadcast. It occurs in the patriotic song Aye Mere Watan Ke Logo sung by Lata Mangeshkar in 1963. The phrase also appeared in early slogans of state-owned Air India, with a 1965 Lok Sabha debate mentioning it as part of the tagline "One Nation, One Leader, One India, Jai Hind".

Mahatma Gandhi sent a piece of crocheted, cotton lace made from yarn he spun by himself, with the central motif of Jai Hind, to Queen Elizabeth II and Prince Philip, as a gift on the occasion of their wedding in 1947.

Other uses
The phrase has also given its name to
Jai Hind (1994), a Tamil movie with Arjun Sarja as hero
 Jai Hind (1999), a Hindi film, made by actor-director Manoj Kumar
 The comedy show Jay Hind!
 Jai Hind College, Mumbai
 Jai Hind, a Gujarati newspaper
 JaiHind TV.

See also
 Bharat Mata
 Banga Mata
 Sri Lanka Mata
 Hindustan Zindabad
 Jai Jawan Jai Kisan
 Joy Bangla
 Jai Maharashtra
 Jaya Jaya He Telangana
 Jai Jai Garavi Gujarat
 Vande Mataram

References

Indian political slogans
National symbols of India
Indian National Army
Indian independence movement
Slogans
Battle cries
Hindi words and phrases